Josh Hodge (born 23 May 2000) is an English rugby union player for Exeter Chiefs in Premiership Rugby. His playing position is fullback.

Hodge came from South Cumbria where he represented Sedbergh School in the starting XV to win the 2017 Daily Mail Trophy and was Player of the Tournament in the Sedbergh Super 10s competition. He played for the England U18s in the Six Nations Festival as well as the Falcons' junior academy, Hodge played for England Under-19s in their away win over Wales during the 2018–19 season. he was promoted to Newcastle Falcons' senior academy squad in the summer of 2018.

Hodge made his debut for Newcastle in the RFU Championship, scoring a try against Yorkshire Carnegie to remain leaders in the league. Hodge went on to become the top scorer for England U20s in the World Rugby U20 Championship in Argentina, kicking 24 goals from 24 and scoring two tries. Hodge played for them in the 2019 Six Nations Under 20s Championship, where scored on his debut against Ireland U20s and also played in the 2020 Six Nations Under 20s Championship.

On 18 June 2020, Hodge left Newcastle to sign for Exeter Chiefs on an undisclosed length deal from the 2020–21 season. He was called up to the England senior squad as an 'apprentice' player during the 2020 Six Nations Championship under Eddie Jones.

References

External links
England Rugby Profile
Exeter Chiefs Profile
Newcastle Falcons Profile
ESPN Profile
Its Rugby Profile
Ultimate Rugby Profile

2000 births
Living people
English rugby union players
Exeter Chiefs players
Newcastle Falcons players
Rugby union fullbacks
Rugby union players from Lancaster